Julius Adaramola (born 4 April 1990) is a Nigerian footballer who plays for Råde IL. Previously Adaramola played for Olimpia Bălți and Fredrikstad FK.

Career

Club
In the 2010–2011 season, he played all four qualification games in the UEFA Europa League for Olimpia and scored one goal, and is therefore the club's highest scoring and most playing player, along with others.

In the summer of 2013, Adaramola signed a permanent deal with FFK, after external pressure from the public and the environment.

In May 2016, Adaramola joined Råde IL, signing a new three-year contract with Råde in July 2017.

References

External links 
 Profile at www.fotball.no
 Profile at www.altomfotball.no
 
 Profile at www.football-lineups.com
 
 

Nigerian footballers
CSF Bălți players
Fredrikstad FK players
Moldovan Super Liga players
Norwegian First Division players
1990 births
Nigerian expatriate footballers
Expatriate footballers in Moldova
Nigerian expatriate sportspeople in Moldova
Expatriate footballers in Norway
Nigerian expatriate sportspeople in Norway
Living people
Association football midfielders